The following is a list of the codes for MeSH (Medical Subject Headings), a comprehensive controlled vocabulary for the purpose of indexing journal articles and books in the life sciences. It is a product of the United States National Library of Medicine (NLM).

The prefixes (A01, etc.) are linked to more extensive sub-lists of codes; the medical terms are linked to articles on those topics.

The source for this content is the set of 2006 MeSH Trees from NLM.

 A Anatomy 
 A01 body regions (74 articles)
 A02 musculoskeletal system (213 articles)
 A03 digestive system (98 articles)
 A04 respiratory system (46 articles)
 A05 urogenital system (87 articles)
 A06 endocrine system
 A07 cardiovascular system
 A08 nervous system
 A09 sense organs
 A10 tissues
 A11 cells
 A12 fluids and secretions
 A13 animal structures
 A14 stomatognathic system
 A15 hemic and immune systems
 A16 embryonic structures
 A17 integumentary system
 B Organisms
 B01  animals
 B02 algae
 B03 bacteria
 B04 viruses
 B05 fungi
 B06 plants
 B07 archaea
 B08 mesomycetozoea
 C Diseases
 C01 bacterial infections and mycoses
 C02 virus diseases
 C03 parasitic diseases
 C04 neoplasms
 C05 musculoskeletal diseases
 C06 digestive system diseases
 C07 stomatognathic diseases
 C08 respiratory tract diseases
 C09 otorhinolaryngologic diseases
 C10 nervous system diseases
 C11 eye diseases
 C12 urologic and male genital diseases
 C13 female genital diseases and pregnancy complications
 C14 cardiovascular diseases
 C15 hemic and lymphatic diseases
 C16 congenital, hereditary, and neonatal diseases and abnormalities
 C17 skin and connective tissue diseases
 C18 nutritional and metabolic diseases
 C19 endocrine system diseases
 C20 immune system diseases
 C21 disorders of environmental origin
 C22 animal diseases
 C23 pathological conditions, signs and symptoms
 D Chemicals and Drugs
 D01 inorganic chemicals
 D02 organic chemicals
 D03 heterocyclic compounds
 D04 polycyclic compounds
 D05 macromolecular substances
 D06 hormones, hormone substitutes, and hormone antagonists
 D07 none (enzymes and coenzymes)
 D08 enzymes and coenzymes (carbohydrates)
 D09 carbohydrates (lipids)
 D10 lipids (amino acids, peptides, and proteins)
 D11 none (nucleic acids, nucleotides, and nucleosides)
 D12 amino acids, peptides, and proteins
 D13  nucleic acids, nucleotides, and nucleosides
 D20 complex mixtures
 D23 biological factors
 D25 biomedical and dental materials
 D26 pharmaceutical preparations
 D27 chemical actions and uses
 E Analytical, Diagnostic and Therapeutic Techniques and Equipment
 E01 diagnosis
 E02 therapeutics
 E03 anesthesia and analgesia
 E04 surgical procedures, operative
 E05 investigative techniques
 E06 dentistry
 E07 equipment and supplies
 F Psychiatry and Psychology
 F01 behavior and behavior mechanisms
 F02 psychological phenomena and processes
 F03 mental disorders
 F04 behavioral disciplines and activities
 G Biological Sciences
 G01 biological sciences
 G02 health occupations
 G03 environment and public health
 G04 biological phenomena, cell phenomena, and immunity
 G05 genetic processes
 G06 biochemical phenomena, metabolism, and nutrition
 G07 physiological processes
 G08 reproductive and urinary physiology
 G09 circulatory and respiratory physiology
 G10 digestive, oral, and skin physiology
 G11 musculoskeletal, neural, and ocular physiology
 G12 chemical and pharmacologic phenomena
 G13 genetic phenomena
 G14 genetic structures
 H Physical Sciences
 H01 natural sciences
 I Anthropology, Education, Sociology and Social Phenomena
 I01 social sciences
 I02 education
 I03 human activities
 J Technology and Food and Beverages
 J01 technology, industry, and agriculture
 J02 food and beverages
 K Humanities
 K01 humanities
 L Information Science
 L01 information science
 M Persons
 M01 persons
 N Health Care
 N01 population characteristics
 N02 health care facilities, manpower, and services
 N03 health care economics and organizations
 N04 health services administration
 N05 health care quality, access, and evaluation
 V Publication Characteristics
 V01 publication components (publication type)
 V02 publication formats (publication type)
 V03 study characteristics (publication type)
 V04 support of research
 Z Geographic Locations
 Z01 geographic locations

References

 1